General Music Today is a triannual peer-reviewed academic journal that covers the field of music. The journal's editor-in-chief is Shelly Cooper (University of Arizona). It was established in 1991 and is currently published by SAGE Publications in association with the National Association for Music Education.

Abstracting and indexing 
General Music Today is abstracted and indexed in:
 Academic Complete
 Academic Premier
 Education Research Complete
 ERIC
 Expanded Academic ASAP
 Wilson Education Index/Abstracts

External links 
 

SAGE Publishing academic journals
English-language journals
Music journals
Triannual journals
Publications established in 1991